Lick It Up is the eleventh studio album by American rock band Kiss. Before its 1983 release, the band members appeared on MTV without their trademark make-up. It was the first public appearance without make-up by the band, and their first for Mercury Records, where they had been signed following their departure from Casablanca Records.

Recording and release
As soon as the Creatures of the Night Tour/10th Anniversary Tour wrapped up in June, the band immediately went back into the studio to begin work on their next album, which was recorded over the next two months. Lick It Up built upon the harder sound Kiss had displayed on 1982's Creatures of the Night. While Vinnie Vincent contributed lead guitar to six songs on Creatures of the Night as a session player, by the time Lick It Up was released and for all the public knew, he was officially the guitarist in Kiss and played all the lead guitar on the album. For the first time, Vincent appeared on the cover art for the album, whereas Ace Frehley had appeared on the Creatures of the Night cover, despite having already left the band and not being involved in the recording of the album. The opening track (co-written by Vincent) features a solo from Rick Derringer.

"Lick It Up" and "All Hell's Breakin' Loose" were released as singles from the album. They were accompanied by a pair of similarly themed, tongue-in-cheek videos featuring the band (along with many scantily clad women) in desolate, post-apocalyptic settings. "All Hell's Breakin' Loose" is one of three songs in the history of the band in which all four (current at the time) members share songwriting credit, the others being "Love Theme from Kiss" from their debut album and "Back to the Stone Age" from Monster.

Vincent membership
Vincent was not legally a member of the band. Due partly to disputes over what his role in the band and his pay would be (some reports indicated that he had asked for, and was flatly denied, a percentage of the band's gross profits), Vincent never signed any contract making his employment official. These disputes, along with a growing attitude by him that he was solely responsible for the resurgence of Kiss, would lead to him leaving the band (or being fired, depending on the source) after the European leg of the Lick It Up tour.

With the band unable to secure a replacement guitarist on such short notice, Vincent was enticed to return for the American leg of the tour; however, his refusal to sign his contract continued to be a sore point. A major rift developed between him and the rest of the band over his guitar solos. What were supposed to be 5–8 minute solos, timed to finish on a cue so that Paul Stanley could introduce the next song, suddenly extended in some instances, leaving the rest of the band impatiently waiting on stage for Vincent to finish.

At an LA Forum show in January 1984, Vincent continued playing despite Stanley's cueing him to finish the solo. The two nearly came to blows in the dressing room afterward, with Stanley accusing Vincent of showing him up, and Vincent accusing the other three members of ruining his solo and trying to hold him back as a performer. They were separated by Eric Carr and Gene Simmons and a couple of roadies who tried to keep the peace. At a March show in Quebec, Canada, as the band prepared to close out their set, Vincent broke into an impromptu solo, leaving the other band members standing on stage with nothing to do. Vincent left (or was fired for a second time, depending on the source) shortly after. This time, the break was permanent.

Reception and legacy

The album marked a turnaround from the band's flagging fortunes of the previous several years and successfully introduced them to a new generation of fans, as well as marking the beginning of the "unmasked" era that would last for the next decade. In an interview for KISSology 2, Stanley said that "people were now listening with their eyes rather than their ears, mainly because Creatures of the Night was arguably a better album than Lick It Up." He also made the statement that "The only reason why I think people bought Lick It Up more than Creatures of the Night was because we had no make-up on. That was the only reason."

Lick It Up was certified gold on December 22, 1983, the first Kiss album to achieve certification since 1980's Unmasked. It was certified platinum in the US on December 19, 1990. Kerrang! listed Lick It Up at No. 3 on its year-end list of the best hard rock albums of 1983. In 2011, the album placed at No. 10 in Guitar World's readers poll of the top 10 guitar albums of 1983. 

The video for "All Hell's Breaking Loose" was nominated for Best Cinematography at the 1984 MTV Video Music Awards.

"Lick It Up" is a staple of the band's live performances. Due to its popularity among fans, Kiss has performed the song over one thousand and five hundred times as of December 2022, making it one of the group's top ten most played pieces.

Track listing
All credits adapted from the original release.

Personnel
Kiss
Paul Stanley – vocals, rhythm guitar, producer, bass on "Gimme More"
Gene Simmons – vocals, bass guitar, producer
Eric Carr – drums, percussion, backing vocals
Vinnie Vincent – lead guitar, backing vocals

Additional musician
Rick Derringer – guitar solo on "Exciter"

Production
Michael James Jackson – producer
Frank Filipetti – engineer, mixing
Rob Freeman – basic tracks engineer on "Lick It Up", "Dance All Over Your Face", "And on the 8th Day" 
Maria Marquis, Stephen Benben – assistant engineers
Dave Wittman, Dave Caccavo – additional engineering
George Marino – mastering at Sterling Sound, New York

Charts

Album

Singles

Certifications

References

External links

Kiss (band) albums
1983 albums
Albums produced by Gene Simmons
Albums produced by Paul Stanley
Casablanca Records albums
Mercury Records albums
Albums recorded at MSR Studios